The 1931 Dartmouth Indians football team was an American football team that represented Dartmouth College as an independent during the 1931 college football season. In their fifth season under head coach Jackson Cannell, the Indians compiled a 5–3–1 record. Stanley Yudicky was the team captain.

Bill McCall was the team's leading scorer, with 90 points, from 15 touchdowns.

Dartmouth played its home games at Memorial Field on the college campus in Hanover, New Hampshire.

Schedule

References

Dartmouth
Dartmouth Big Green football seasons
Dartmouth Indians football